Patricia Young (born 1954 in Victoria, British Columbia) is a Canadian poet, and short story writer.

She is married to writer Terence Young. Their daughter Clea Young is also a writer, whose debut short story collection Teardown was published in 2016.

Poetry

Short stories

Anthologies

A Walk by the Seine, Canadian Poets on Paris. (Black Moss Press, 1996).
Anthology of Magazine Verse and Yearbook of American Poetry. (Monitor Book Co., 1995/96).
Making Connections: Literacy from a Feminist Perspective. (Canadian Congress for Learning Opportunities for Women, 1996)

Awards and nominations

 Butler Prize, shortlist for Here Come The Moonbathers, 2009 
 Airstream included on Globe and Mail's list of best 100 books of the year 2006
 Butler Prize, shortlist for Airstream, 2000
 Meltcalf-Rooke Award, for Airstream, 2006 Governor General's Award nominee for Ruin & Beauty, 2000
 B.C. Book Prize for What I Remember From My Time On Earth, 1997
 Governor General's Award nominee for More Watery Still, 1993
 Pat Lowther Award for The Mad And Beautiful Mothers, 1989
 Dorothy Livesay Poetry Prize for All I Ever Needed Was A Beautiful Room,'' 1987

Prizes: poetry

Federation of B. C. Writers, Literary Rites Competition, 1987, First Prize 
National Magazine Award, 1988 
C.B.C. Literary Competition, 1988, Second Prize  	 
League of Canadian Poets National Poetry Competition, Co-winner 
Aya Press Tenth Anniversary Literary Competition, First Prize, 1989 
League of Canadian Poets National Poetry Contest, 1993, Second Prize
Grain Prose Poem Contest, Co-winner, 1995 
League of Canadian Poets National Poetry Contest, First Prize, 1996
CV2 Annual Poetry Contest, First Prize, 1996
Room of One's Own Poetry Contest, 1996
League of Canadian Poets National Poetry Contest, Second Prize, 1997                      
George Woodcock Poetry Contest, Canada India Village Aid, First Prize, 1997
The Stephen Leacock Poetry Award: The Orillia International Poetry Festival, 1997
Mothertongue Chapbook Competition, second prize, 1998
Grain Prose Poem Prize, co-winner, 1998
Prairie Fire, Bliss Carmen Award, First Prize, 1998
Grain Postcard Story Prize, Co-winner, 1999
National Magazine Award for Poetry, silver, 1999
Room of One's Own, Poetry Contest, second prize, 2007
Prairie Fire, second prize, 2008
Grain, Prose Poem Prize, Co-winner, 2008
Arc's Poem of the Year Contest, first prize, 2008
Room of One's Own Poetry Contest, second prize, 2008
Fiddlehead Poetry Contest, Honorable Mention, 2009
C. B. C. Literary Awards, finalist, 2009
Malahat Review Long Poem Competition, shortlist, 2009 & 2011
Arc's Poem of the Year Contest, first prize, 2009
Malahat Review Open Season Award, shortlist, 2009 & 2012
Bridport Poetry Prize (UK), shortlist, 2009
C.B.C. Literary Awards, finalist, 2010
Prism International Poetry Competition, Honourable Mention, 2010
The Antigonish Review's Great Blue Heron Contest, Third Prize, 2010
The New Quarterly, Occasional Verse Contest, Second Prize, 2010
The Confederation Poet's Prize, 2010
C.B.C. Literary Awards, finalist, 2011
The Antigonish Review's Great Blue Heron Contest, First Prize, 2011
Room of One's Own Poetry Contest, First Prize, 2011
Montreal International Poetry Prize, shortlist, 2011
Malahat Review, Open Season Award, shortlist, 2012
Prism International Poetry Competition, Third Prize, 2012

Prizes: fiction

Other Voices Fiction Award, First Prize, 2000
Matrix, First Prize, 2001
Fiddlehead Fiction Contest, Honorable Mention 2001
Other Voices Fiction Award, First Prize, 2001
Fiddlehead Fiction Prize, Honorable Mention, 2002
Room of One's Own Fiction Prize, First Prize, 2003
Fiddlehead Fiction Prize, Honorable Mention, 2004
Journey Prize, 2004, Short-list
This Magazine's Great Canadian Literary Hunt, Second Prize, 2006

References

1954 births
Living people
Canadian women poets
20th-century Canadian poets
21st-century Canadian poets
Writers from Victoria, British Columbia
Canadian women short story writers
20th-century Canadian women writers
21st-century Canadian women writers
20th-century Canadian short story writers
21st-century Canadian short story writers